Charles Frederick (2 February 1783 – 8 July 1853) was the reigning Grand Duke of Saxe-Weimar-Eisenach.

Biography
Born in Weimar, he was the eldest son of Charles Augustus, Grand Duke of Saxe-Weimar-Eisenach and Luise Auguste of Hesse-Darmstadt.

Charles Frederick succeeded his father as Grand Duke when the latter died in 1828. His capital, Weimar, continued to be a cultural center of Central Europe, even after the death of Goethe in 1832. Johann Nepomuk Hummel made his career in Weimar as Kapellmeister until his death in 1837. Franz Liszt settled in Weimar in 1848 as Kapellmeister  and gathered about him a circle that kept the Weimar court a major musical centre.  Due to the intervention of Liszt, the composer Richard Wagner found refuge in Weimar after he was forced to flee Saxony for his role in the revolutionary disturbances there in 1848-49.  Wagner's opera Lohengrin was first performed in Weimar in August 1850.

Charles Frederick died at Schloss Belvedere, Weimar, in 1853 and was buried in the Weimarer Fürstengruft.

Family and children

In St. Petersburg on 3 August 1804, Charles Frederick married the Grand Duchess Maria Pavlovna of Russia, daughter of Emperor Paul I. They had four children:
 Paul Alexander Karl Constantin Frederick August (b. Weimar, 25 September 1805 – d. Weimar, 10 April 1806).
 Marie Luise Alexandrine (b. Weimar, 3 February 1808 – d. Berlin, 18 January 1877), married on 26 May 1827 to Karl of Prussia.
 Marie Luise Augusta Katharine (b. Weimar, 30 September 1811 – d. Berlin, 7 January 1890), married on 11 June 1829 to Wilhelm of Prussia, who became Wilhelm I, German Emperor.
 Karl Alexander August Johann, Grand Duke of Saxe-Weimar-Eisenach (b. Weimar, 24 June 1818 – d. Weimar, 5 January 1901), married on 8 October 1842 to Sophie of the Netherlands.

Ancestry

References

|-

1783 births
1853 deaths
Princes of Saxe-Weimar-Eisenach
Protestant monarchs
Nobility from Weimar
Grand Dukes of Saxe-Weimar-Eisenach
Grand Crosses of the Order of Saint Stephen of Hungary